Keion Crossen (born April 17, 1996) is an American football cornerback for the Miami Dolphins of the National Football League (NFL). He was drafted in the seventh round of the 2018 NFL Draft by the New England Patriots. He played college football at Western Carolina.

College career
A two-sport student-athlete during his time in Cullowhee, Crossen stood out on the football field while also lending his talents to the Western Carolina track & field teams where he was the SoCon champion in the men's 100-meter dash at the 2016 outdoor championships, setting a school-record with a time of 10.33 which also qualified him for the NCAA East Preliminary. 
On the football field, Crossen was a two-year starter in the defensive secondary for the Catamounts, amassing 165 career tackles in 46 games over his four-year career including 106 solo stops and five tackles for loss. He finished with three career interceptions and a total of 19 pass break-ups - seven in both his junior and senior seasons.

Professional career

New England Patriots
Crossen was drafted by the New England Patriots in the seventh round (243rd overall) of the 2018 NFL Draft. Crossen helped the Patriots reach Super Bowl LIII where they  defeated the Los Angeles Rams 13-3.

Houston Texans
On August 31, 2019, Crossen was traded to the Houston Texans for a conditional future draft pick.
In the Divisional Round of the playoffs against the Kansas City Chiefs, Crossen recovered a fumble lost by punt returner Tyreek Hill during the 51–31 loss.

New York Giants
On August 16, 2021, Crossen was traded to the New York Giants in exchange for a 2023 sixth-round draft pick.

Miami Dolphins
On March 17, 2022, Crossen signed a three-year contract with the Miami Dolphins.

References

External links
Houston Texans bio

1996 births
Living people
People from Northampton County, North Carolina
Players of American football from North Carolina
American football cornerbacks
Western Carolina Catamounts football players
Houston Texans players
New England Patriots players
New York Giants players
Miami Dolphins players